Gene Howard Golub (February 29, 1932 – November 16, 2007), was an American numerical analyst who taught at Stanford University as Fletcher Jones Professor of Computer Science and held a courtesy appointment in electrical engineering.

Personal life
Born in Chicago, he was educated at the University of Illinois at Urbana-Champaign, receiving his B.S. (1953), M.A. (1954) and Ph.D. (1959) all in mathematics. His M.A. degree was more specifically in Mathematical Statistics. His PhD dissertation was entitled "The Use of Chebyshev Matrix Polynomials in the Iterative Solution of Linear Equations Compared to the Method of Successive Overrelaxation" and his thesis adviser was Abraham Taub. Gene Golub succumbed to acute myeloid leukemia on the morning of 16 November 2007 at the Stanford Hospital.

Stanford University
He arrived at Stanford in 1962 and became a professor there in 1970. He advised more than thirty doctoral students, many of whom have themselves achieved distinction. Gene Golub was an important figure in numerical analysis and pivotal to creating the NA-Net and the NA-Digest, as well as the International Congress on Industrial and Applied Mathematics.

One of his best-known books is Matrix Computations,
co-authored with Charles F. Van Loan. He was a major contributor to algorithms for matrix decompositions. In particular he published an algorithm together with William Kahan in 1970 that made the computation of the singular value decomposition (SVD) feasible and that is still used today. A survey of his work was published in 2007 by Oxford University Press as "Milestones in Matrix Computation".

Recognition
Golub was awarded the B. Bolzano Gold Medal for Merits in the Field of Mathematical Sciences and was one of the few elected to three national academies: the National Academy of Sciences (1993), the National Academy of Engineering (1990), and the  American Academy of Arts and Sciences (1994). He was also a Foreign Member of the Royal Swedish Academy of Engineering Sciences (1986).

He is listed as an ISI highly cited researcher. He held 11 honorary doctorates and was scheduled to receive an honorary doctorate from ETH Zürich on November 17, 2007. He was a visiting professor at Princeton (1970), MIT (1979), ETH (1974 & 2002), and Oxford (1982, 1998 & 2007).

Gene Golub served as the president of the Society for Industrial and Applied Mathematics (SIAM) from 1985 to 1987 and was founding editor of both the SIAM Journal on Scientific Computing (SISC) and the SIAM Journal on Matrix Analysis and Applications (SIMAX).

Most of Golub's research work was collaborative.  He had at least 181 distinct co-authors
and the number may still increase as co-authored papers keep appearing posthumously.

Selected publications

Articles

Books
 with Charles Van Loan: Matrix Computations (= Johns Hopkins Series in the Mathematical Sciences. 3). Johns Hopkins University Press, Baltimore MD 1983, ISBN 0-8018-3010-9; 2nd edition 1989; 3rd edition 1996; 4th edition 2013
 Studies in Numerical Analysis. Mathematical Association of America, 1985, 426 pages.
 with James M. Ortega: Scientific Computing and Differential Equations. An Introduction to Numerical Methods. Academic Press, Boston MA etc. 1992, ISBN 0-12-289255-0.
 with James M. Ortega: Scientific Computing: An Introduction with Parallel Computing. Academic Press, 1993; 2014 pbk reprint
 with Moody T. Chu: Inverse Eigenvalue problems. Theory, algorithms, and applications. Oxford University Press, Oxford etc. 2005, ISBN 0-19-856664-6.
 Milestones in Matrix Computation: The Selected Works of Gene H. Golub with Commentaries. Oxford University Press, 2007.
 with Gérard Meurant: Matrices, Moments and Quadrature with Applications. Princeton University Press, 2009,

References

External links
Home page at Stanford University 

Oral history interviews with Gene H. Golub, Charles Babbage Institute, University of Minnesota.  Interview by Pamela McCorduck, 16 May 1979 and 8 June 1979, Stanford, California.
Gene Golub, Oral history interview by Thomas Haigh, 22–23 October 2005, Stanford University. Society for Industrial and Applied Mathematics, Philadelphia, PA, six-hour interview covers full career - transcript online.
Gene Golub in pictures around the world.
 Gene Golub Papers
"Because of space limitations... Master bibliography of matrix computation (pdf, 565 Kbytes, 66 pages) is online" from 4th edition (2013) of "Matrix computations": 
Dianne P. O'Leary, "Gene H. Golub", Biographical Memoirs of the National Academy of Sciences (2018)

Numerical analysts
20th-century American mathematicians
21st-century American mathematicians
Jewish American scientists
Members of the United States National Academy of Sciences
Members of the United States National Academy of Engineering
Fellows of the American Academy of Arts and Sciences
Members of the Royal Swedish Academy of Engineering Sciences
Deaths from acute myeloid leukemia
Singular value decomposition
Stanford University School of Engineering faculty
University of Illinois Urbana-Champaign alumni
Deaths from cancer in California
1932 births
2007 deaths
Presidents of the Society for Industrial and Applied Mathematics
20th-century American Jews
21st-century American Jews